This is a list of seasons completed by the Hershey Bears of the American Hockey League.  This list documents the records and playoff results for all seasons the Bears have completed in the AHL since their inception in 1932.

Season-by-season record

Team records

Single season
Goals: 60 Alexandre Giroux (2008–09)
Assists: 89 George "Red" Sullivan (1953–54)
Points: 124 Tim Tookey (1986–87)
Penalty minutes: 432 Steve Martinson (1985–86) 
GAA: 1.98 Alfie Moore (1938–39)
SV%:

Career
Career goals: 260 Dunc Fisher
Career assists: 636 Mike Nykoluk
Career points: 808 Mike Nykoluk
Career penalty minutes: 1519  Mike Stothers
Career goaltending wins: 226 Gordie Henry
Career shutouts: 29 Nick Damore
Career games: 972 Mike Nykoluk
Career games coached:  1,256 (610–512–134) Frank Mathers

Team season records
Division championships: 18
Regular season points championships: 8
Most points-one season: 123 2009–10
Fewest points-one season: 44 1955–56
Most wins-one season: 60 2009–10
Fewest wins-one season: 19 1955–56
Most losses-one season: 44 1977–78
Fewest losses-one season: 13 1942–43
Most ties-one season (No OT): 16 1969–70
Most ties-one season (With OT): 12 1990–91, 1992–93
Fewest ties-one season (No OT): 5 1948–49
Fewest ties-one season (With OT): 1 1952–53
Fewest ties at home-season: 0 1982–83
Shootout wins-one season: 7 (7–2 overall) 2004–05

Hershey Bears
American Hockey League team seasons